Sucheta Khanna is an Indian TV and film actress. She has worked in detective serial 'Karamchand'(2007) and then Hari Mirchi Lal Mirchi, a comedy serial telecast by DD National. She played the role of Indumati in the SAB TV comedy series Lapataganj as Indumati, wife of Mukundilal Gupta.
She played the role of Pinky on the same channel SAB TV in the show Peterson Hill wife of Kishorilal Chadda, a stationmaster. She also played the role of Bijli Devi in Jijaji Chhat Parr Koii Hai

She played the role of Elina in Malayalam film Kakkakuyil along with Mohanlal and Mukesh . She played the role of Poli in the 2011 comic caper Yamla Pagla Deewana. She also had a guest appearance, as Sapna in Anjaana Anjaani and in Sandwich (2006 film). She returned in Yamla Pagla Deewana 2 in 2013 playing Babli. She played the main role of Kokila Kulkarni in the show Shrimaan Shrimati Phir Se, a reboot of popular 90s show Shriman Shrimati

Filmography

Films

Television

References

External links
 

Indian television actresses
Indian film actresses
Living people
Year of birth missing (living people)
Actresses in Malayalam cinema
Actresses in Hindi cinema